Mishak Makhur (lit. Sold Game or Fixed Game) is an Israeli TV current affairs show that was broadcast on Channel 2 between 2004 and 2006. It was produced for Reshet by Ma'agalot Productions. During 2008, rumors about possible return to the screen were heard.

The show was the first comedy panel show in the Israeli TV. The original line-up, in 2004, included Einav Galili as chairman, with Lior Schleien, the creator of the show, comedians Guri Alfi and Reshef Levi, and Gil Riva, a flamboyant journalist. In the second season, Reshef and Gil left the show while Lior and Guri remained as team captains accompanied by a guest host, often a politician, journalist or comedian.

The show had two spin offs:
 "Grill" a local version of Roast
 "Security Zone" ("Retsuat HaBitahon"), a special daily show during the 2006 Lebanon War.

References

External links
Official website (in Hebrew)

Israeli television shows
Channel 2 (Israeli TV channel) original programming
2000s Israeli television series
2004 Israeli television series debuts
2006 Israeli television series endings